Scandinavian literature or Nordic literature  is the literature in the languages of the Nordic countries  of Northern Europe. The Nordic countries include Denmark, Finland, Iceland, Norway (including Svalbard), Sweden, and Scandinavia's associated autonomous territories (Åland, Faroe Islands and Greenland). The majority of these nations and regions use North Germanic languages. Although majority of Finns speak Uralic languages, Finnish history and literature are clearly interrelated with those of both Sweden and Norway who have shared control of various areas and who have substantial Sami populations/influences.

These peoples have produced an important and influential literature.  Henrik Ibsen, a Norwegian playwright, was largely responsible for the popularity of modern realistic drama in Europe, with plays like The Wild Duck and A Doll's House.  Nobel prizes for literature, itself a Scandinavian award, have been awarded to Selma Lagerlöf, Verner von Heidenstam, Karl Adolph Gjellerup, Henrik Pontoppidan, Knut Hamsun, Sigrid Undset, Erik Axel Karlfeldt, Frans Eemil Sillanpää, Johannes Vilhelm Jensen, Pär Lagerkvist, Halldór Laxness, Nelly Sachs, Eyvind Johnson, Harry Martinson, and Tomas Tranströmer.

Medieval Scandinavian literature
In medieval times Scandinavia shared first Proto-Norse and then Old Norse as a common language. The earliest written records from Scandinavia are runic inscriptions on memorial stones and other objects. Some of those contain allusions to Norse mythology and even short poems in alliterative verse. The best known example is the elaborate Rök runestone (ca. 800) which alludes to legends from the migration age. The oldest of the Eddic poems are believed to have been composed in the 9th century, though they are only preserved in 13th-century manuscripts. They tell of the myths and heroic legends of Scandinavia. Skaldic poetry is mostly preserved in late manuscripts but was preserved orally from the 9th century onwards, and also appears on runestones, such as the Karlevi Runestone.

The advent of Christianity in the 10th century brought Scandinavia into contact with European learning, including the Latin alphabet and the Latin language. In the 12th century this was to bear literary fruit in works such as the Danish Gesta Danorum an ambitious historical work by Saxo Grammaticus. The 13th century was a golden age of Icelandic literature with Snorri Sturluson's Prose Edda and Heimskringla.

Danish literature

The 16th century brought the Lutheran Reformation to Denmark and a new period in the nation's literature. Major authors of the time include the humanist Christiern Pedersen, who translated the New Testament into Danish, and Poul Helgesen who vigorously opposed the Reformation. The 16th century also saw Denmark's earliest plays, including the works of Hieronymus Justesen Ranch. The 17th century was an era of renewed interest in Scandinavian antiquities with scholars like Ole Worm at the forefront. Though religious dogmatism was on the rise the passionate hymns of Thomas Kingo transcended the genre with personal expression. External struggles with Sweden and internal rivalries among the nobility leading to Denmark's absolute monarchy in 1660 are chronicled from a royal prisoner's redemptive perspective in the heartfelt prose of Leonora Christina of the Blue Tower. Later Danish authors include Hans Christian Andersen, Søren Kierkegaard, Johannes V. Jensen, and Karen Blixen.

Faroese literature

Faroese literature in the traditional sense of the word has only really developed in the past 100–200 years. This is mainly because of the island's isolation, and also because the Faroese language was not written down in a standardised format until 1890. In the Middle Ages many Faroese poems and stories were handed down orally. These works were split into the following divisions: sagnir (historical), ævintyr (stories) and kvæði (ballads, often set to music and dance). These were eventually written down in the 19th century, providing the basis for a late but powerful literature.

Finnish literature

The history of Finland has been tumultuous. During much of recorded history the language of the government was different from that of the majority of the population. This had a strong influence on 'Finnish literature' with many of the greatest works revolving around achieving or maintaining a strong Finnish identity.

The most famous collection of folk poetry is by far the Kalevala. Referred to as the Finnish national epic it is mainly credited to Elias Lönnrot although he worked more as an editor and compiler. It was first published in 1835 and quickly became a symbol of Finnish nationalism. The first novel published in Finnish was Seven Brothers (1870) by Aleksis Kivi (1834—1872): still generally considered to be one of the greatest of all works of Finnish literature.

Icelandic literature

The Icelanders' sagas—many of which are also known as family sagas—are prose histories describing mostly events that took place in Iceland in the 10th and early 11th centuries. They are the best known of specifically Icelandic literature from the early period. In late medieval times rímur became the most popular form of poetic expression. Influential Icelandic authors since the reformation include Hallgrímur Pétursson, Jónas Hallgrímsson, Gunnar Gunnarsson and Halldór Laxness.

Norwegian literature

The period from the 14th century up to the 19th is considered a dark age in Norway's literature though Norwegian-born writers such as Peder Claussøn Friis and Ludvig Holberg contributed to the common literature of Denmark-Norway. With the advent of nationalism and the struggle for independence in the early 19th century a new period of national literature emerged. The dramatist Henrik Wergeland was the most influential author of the period while the later works of Henrik Ibsen were to earn Norway an influential place in Western European literature. In the 20th century notable Norwegian writers include the three Nobel Prize–winning authors Knut Hamsun, Bjørnstjerne Bjørnson and Sigrid Undset.

Swedish literature

Sweden ranks third in the list of countries with most Nobel Prize laureates in literature. Famous Swedish writers include Selma Lagerlöf, Astrid Lindgren, Gustaf Fröding, Carl Jonas Love Almqvist, Vilhelm Moberg, August Strindberg, and Tomas Tranströmer.

Recognition

International Prizes

Nobel Prize in Literature
The Nobel Prize in Literature has been awarded to a number of Scandinavians, including:

Denmark
Johannes Vilhelm Jensen, 1944
Karl Adolph Gjellerup, 1917
Henrik Pontoppidan, 1917
Finland
Frans Eemil Sillanpää, born in the Grand Duchy of Finland, a part of the Russian Empire in 1809–1917, 1939
Iceland
Halldór Kiljan Laxness, 1955
Norway
Sigrid Undset, 1928
Knut Hamsun, 1920
Bjørnstjerne Bjørnson, 1903
Sweden
Tomas Tranströmer, 2011
Eyvind Johnson, 1974
Harry Martinson, 1974
Nelly Sachs, born in Germany, 1966
Pär Lagerkvist, 1951
Erik Axel Karlfeldt, 1931
Carl Gustaf Verner von Heidenstam,1916
Selma Lagerlöf, 1909

Regional Prizes

The Nordic Council's Literature Prize
The Nordic Council's Literature Prize is awarded by a Nordic adjudication committee for literature  (novel, a play, a collection of poetry, short stories or essays) written in one of the Nordic languages. The committee is appointed by the Nordic Council and consists of 10 members: 
 Two from Denmark,
 Two from Finland (1 Finnish speaking and 1 Swedish speaking)
 Two from Iceland,
 Two from Norway and
 Two from Sweden.

National Prizes

Finland
 The Finlandia Literature Prize
 Thanks for the Book Award is a literary prize presented by the Organization of the Booksellers’ Association of Finland
 Atorox Award for science fiction

Norway
 The Norwegian Critics Prize for Literature
 Halldis Moren Vesaas Prize
 NBU-prisen
 The Norwegian Academy Prize in memory of Thorleif Dahl
 The Norwegian Academy of Literature and Freedom of Expression

Sweden
 The Selma Lagerlöf literature prize
 The Svenska Dagbladet Literary Prize
 The August (Strindberg) Prize
 Sveriges Radio's listeners' prize for literature
 Samfundet De Nio Prize
 Dobloug Prize – a Swedish Academy literature prize for Swedish and Norwegian fiction.

See also
Nordic noir, Scandinavian crime fiction
Project Runeberg, a project that publishes freely available electronic versions of Nordic books.

References

European literature
Nordic literature
Scandinavian studies